George Angus Ross (1854 – June 29, 1888) was a lawyer and political figure in Nova Scotia, Canada. He represented Lunenburg County in the Nova Scotia House of Assembly from 1882 to 1889 as a Liberal member.

Early life and education
He was born in Lunenburg, Nova Scotia, the son of William Ross, a Scottish immigrant, and was educated at the Academy there. Ross was called to the bar in 1875.

Career
He served as a captain in the militia. As a Nova Scotia Liberal, he supported the repeal of Confederation. Ross died in office.

Essay on evolution
In 1874 Ross published an essay discussing the evidence in favour of the evolution of species and arguing for the compatibility of Christianity with the natural science of evolution.

References 
The Canadian parliamentary companion, 1883 JA Gemmill

1854 births
1888 deaths
Nova Scotia Liberal Party MLAs